"Brave Shine" is the eighth single by Japanese singer Aimer, released on June 3, 2015 under Defstar Records. Written by Aimer (under her pen name "aimerrhythm") and Hisashi Koyama, the song was used as the second opening theme of the anime TV series Fate/stay night: Unlimited Blade Works. Originally, the series' second opening theme was intended to be "Last Stardust", composed also by Aimer. However, the staff did not find it fitting for the video's sequences and instead used "Brave Shine".

The single peaked at No. 4 on both Oricon's singles charts and Billboard Japan's Hot 100.

Track listing

CD

DVD
"Brave Shine" (Music video) - 3:55

Limited Edition DVD
Fate/stay night: Unlimited Blade Works Non-credit Opening Movie - 1:40

Music video
The music video takes place in a post-apocalyptic world, where a couple roams across the desert as a dark spirit follows them. As the man carries the woman up a volcano, they confront the entity and reach the summit and embrace as the volcano erupts.

Chart position

Awards and nominations

References

External links 
  (Aimer-web)
  (agehasprings)
  (Sony Music Entertainment Japan)
 "Brave Shine" on quia
 223 "Brave Shine" on Arata Kato Photography
 
 Brave Shine / Aimer on VGMdb

2015 singles
2015 songs
Aimer songs
Anime songs
Defstar Records singles
Japanese-language songs